Boulevard is a New American fine dining restaurant located in San Francisco, California.

History
The restaurant was opened by Nancy Oakes along with her financier Pat Kuleto in 1993. In 2012, she won the James Beard Award for Outstanding Restaurant.

Nancy won Outstanding Chef in 2015.

See also 

 List of New American restaurants

References

External links
 

1993 establishments in California
Restaurants in San Francisco
Restaurants established in 1993
James Beard Foundation Award winners
Fine dining
New American restaurants in California